Pull up may refer to:

 Pull-up (exercise), an upper body exercise
 Pull-up resistor, a technique in digital electronics
 Pull up, a code refactoring technique used in object-oriented programming
 Pull up, the process of changing a film from one frame rate to another - see telecine
 Training pants, a form of diaper that is in one solid piece, in the same form as underwear, lacking taped sides
 Pull-up jumper, a basketball move in which a player dribble drives, stops and shoots a jump shot
 Pull up, to stop or slow a racehorse during or after a race or workout
 "PULL UP", an audible warning given by the ground proximity warning systems of many fixed-wing aircraft

Music
"Pull Up" (KSI song), 2019
 "Pull Up" (Wiz Khalifa song), 2016
 "Pull Up", a song by American hip hop recording artist Lil Wayne from Free Weezy Album
 "Pull Up", a song by Swedish DJ Martin Jensen
 "Pull Up", a song by KSI featuring Jme from the 2019 album New Age
 "Pull Up", a 2016 song by Rich Gang featuring Jacquees, Ralo Stylz and Birdman; see London on da Track production discography § Ralo - Diary of the Streets 2
 "Pull Up", a 2004 song by Mr. Vegas

See also
Pulldown (disambiguation)